Metzneria talassica is a moth of the family Gelechiidae. It was first described by V.I Piskunov in 1979. It is found in Kazakhstan.

References

Moths described in 1979
Metzneria